La hermana dinamita ("The Dynamite Sister") is a 1970 Mexican film. It stars Jorge Rivero, Sara García and Hilda Aguirre.

External links
 

1970 films
Mexican comedy-drama films
1970s Spanish-language films
1970s Mexican films